Ozonide is the polyatomic anion . Cyclic organic compounds formed by the addition of ozone to an alkene are also called ozonides.

Ionic ozonides
Inorganic ozonides are dark red salts. The anion has the bent shape of the ozone molecule.

Inorganic ozonides are formed by burning potassium, rubidium, or caesium in ozone, or by treating the alkali metal hydroxide with ozone; this yields potassium ozonide, rubidium ozonide, and caesium ozonide respectively. They are very sensitive explosives that have to be handled at low temperatures in an atmosphere consisting of an inert gas.

Ionic ozonides are being investigated as sources of oxygen in chemical oxygen generators. Tetramethylammonium ozonide, which can be made by a metathesis reaction with caesium ozonide in liquid ammonia, is stable up to :

CsO3 + [(CH3)4N][O2] -> CsO2 + [(CH3)4N][O3]

Alkaline earth metal ozonide compounds have also become known. For instance, magnesium ozonide complexes have been isolated in a low-temperature argon matrix.

Covalent singly bonded structures 
Phosphite ozonides, are used in the production of singlet oxygen. They are made by ozonizing a phosphite ester in dichloromethane at low temperatures, and decompose to yield singlet oxygen and a phosphate ester:

 (RO)3P + O3 -> (RO)3PO3
 (RO)3PO3 -> (RO)3PO + ^{1}O2

Molozonides

Molozonides are formed by the addition reaction between ozone and alkenes. They are rarely isolated during the course of the ozonolysis reaction sequence. Molozonides are unstable and rapidly convert to the trioxolane ring structure with a five-membered C–O–O–C–O ring. They usually appear in the form of foul-smelling oily liquids, and rapidly decompose in the presence of water to carbonyl compounds: aldehydes, ketones, peroxides.

See also
 Ozonolysis
 Ozone cracking
 Superoxide, 
 Oxide, 
 Dioxygenyl,

References

External links
 Matrix reactions of alkali metal atoms with ozone: Infrared spectra of the alkali metal ozonide molecules

Ozonides
Free radicals
Explosive chemicals